Mehtab Singh may refer to:

 Mehtab Singh (footballer)
 Mehtab Singh Bhangu (18th Century), Sikh warrior and martyr
 Mehtab Singh Grewal
 Nghlhav Mehtabs Singh, Indian boxer